Acanthodactylus nilsoni, commonly called Nilson's spiny-toed lizard, is a species of lizard in the family Lacertidae. The species is endemic to Iran.

Etymology
The specific name, nilsoni, is in honor of Swedish herpetologist Göran Nilson (born 1948).

Geographic range
A. nilsoni is found in Kermanshah Province, western Iran.

Description

Reproduction
A. nilsoni is oviparous.

References

Further reading
Rastegar-Pouyani, Nasrullah (1998). "A new species of Acanthodactylus (Sauria: Lacertidae) from Qasr-E-Shirin, Kermanshah Province, Western Iran". Proceedings of the California Academy of Sciences 50: 257–265. (Acanthodactylus nilsoni, new species).
Sindaco, Roberto; Jeremčenko, Valery K. (2008). The Reptiles of the Western Palearctic. 1. Annotated Checklist and Distributional Atlas of the Turtles, Crocodiles, Amphisbaenians and Lizards of Europe, North Africa, Middle East and Central Asia. (Monographs of the Societas Herpetologica Italica). Latina, Italy: Edizioni Belvedere. 580 pp. .
Šmíd, Jiří; Moravec, Jiří; Kodym, Petr; Yousefkhani, Seyyed Saeed Hosseinian; Rastegar-Pouyani, Eskandar; Frynta, Daniel (2014). "Annotated checklist and distribution of the lizards of Iran". Zootaxa 3855 (1): 001–097.

Acanthodactylus
Lizards of Asia
Reptiles described in 1998
Taxa named by Nasrullah Rastegar Pouyani
Endemic fauna of Iran